Chihab is a surname. Notable people with the surname include:

Atik Chihab (born 1982), Moroccan footballer
Tariq Chihab (born 1975), Moroccan footballer
Zakaria Chihab (born 1926), retired Lebanese wrestler

See also
Chihab al-Umari (1300–1384), Arab historian, born in Damascus